= TravelLady =

- Available in: English
- Founded: 1994
- Headquarters: Dallas, Texas, {{{location_country}}}
- Website: TravelLady

TravelLady is a free online travel magazine with over 200 international travel writers contributing. It was started in 1994 by Madelyn Miller. It is based in Dallas, Texas.

The site contains recommendations for various travel destinations around the world. There is an extensive section of articles that offer advice on a number of special interest topics, such as art galleries and scuba diving.

The magazine is updated daily with new travel articles and Travel Tidbits. Over 5,000 travel articles are archived online.
